Korea State, currently spelled as Koriya, was a princely state of the British Empire of India. After Indian independence in 1947, the ruler of Korea acceded to the Union of India on 1 January 1948, and Koriya was made part of Surguja District of Central Provinces and Berar province. In January 1950, "Central Provinces and Berar" province was renamed Madhya Pradesh state. After November 2000, Korea and the former princely state of Changbhakar became Koriya district of Chhattisgarh state.

Korea had an area of 1,631 sq. miles and a population of 126,874 as of 1941.

Location
The state of Korea, which included 400 villages, was in what is now Chhattisgarh state. It bordered Rewa to the north and also to the southwest; Surguja State to the east; the British district of Bilaspur (Central Provinces) to the south; and Changbhakar State to the west.

History
Korea State was founded in the 17th century.  The ruling family of Koriya were Rajputs of the Chauhan dynasty who came to Koriya from Rajputana in the 13th century and conquered the country. Before the coming of the Marathas, it is alleged that the rajas of Koriya "lived in perfect independence, and never having been necessitated to submit to the payment of any tribute, they had no occasion to oppress their subjects." This situation changed in 1790 when Korea had to pay tribute to the Marathas.

Historically Korea State also seems to have had some indefinite feudal relations with Surguja, but the British government ignored this claim when Koriya was ceded to them by the Bhonsle Raja of Nagpur in 1818. 
On 24 Dec 1819 the state became a British protectorate. Upon the extinction of the direct line in 1897, a distant collateral branch of the ruling family was recognized as successor by the British Raj.

In 1891, the Raj decided that the five states of the Surguja group (Surguja, Udaipur, Jashpur, Korea, and Changbhakar), as well as the states of Bonai, Gangpur, Seraikela, and Kharsawan, formerly known as the Tributary Mahals of Chhota Nagpur, were not part of British India, and revised sanads were issued in 1899 formally recognizing them as feudatory states and defining their relations with the British Raj.

Rulers
The rulers of the state have apparently always held the title of 'Raja' and were so recognized by the British as early as 1819.

Rajas

.... - ....                Jit Rai Deo 
.... - ....                Sagar Sahi Deo 
.... - ....                Afhar Sahi Deo 
.... - ....                Jahan Sahi Deo 
.... - ....                Sawal Sahi Deo 
.... - ....                Gajraj Singh Deo 
1795 - Jun 1828            Gharib Singh Deo                   (b. 1745 - d. 1828) 
Jun 1828 - 1864            Amole Singh Deo                    (b. 1785 - d. 1864) 
 4 Apr 1864 - 1897         Pran Singh Deo                     (b. 1857/59 - d. 1897) 
1897 - 18 Nov 1909         Sheo Mangal Singh Deo              (b. 1874 - d. 1909) 
18 Nov 1909 – 15 Aug 1947  Ramanuj Pratap Singh Deo           (b. 1901 - d. 1954)

See also
Eastern States Agency
Chirmiri
Manendragarh

References

External links

Dr. Sanjay Alung - Chhattisgarh ki poorv Riyaste aur Jamindariyaa - On line

History of Chhattisgarh
Koriya district
Rajputs